Some observers believe that existentialism forms a philosophical ground for anarchism. Anarchist historian Peter Marshall (1946- ) claims "there is a close link between the existentialists' stress on the individual, free choice, and moral responsibility and the main tenets of anarchism".

Background

Max Stirner
Anarchism had a proto-existentialist view mainly in the writings of German individualist anarchist Max Stirner. In his book The Ego and Its Own (1845), Stirner advocates concrete individual existence, or egoism, against most commonly accepted social institutions—including the state, property as a right, natural rights in general, and the very notion of society—which he considers mere phantasms or essences in the mind. Existentialism, according to Herbert Read, "is eliminating all systems of idealism, all theories of life or being that subordinate man to an idea, to an abstraction of some sort. It is also eliminating all systems of materialism that subordinate man to the operation of physical and economic laws. It is saying that man is the reality—not even man in the abstract, but the human person, you and I; and that everything else—freedom, love, reason, God—is a contingency depending on the will of the individual. In this respect, existentialism has much in common with Max Stirner's egoism."

Friedrich Nietzsche
Friedrich Nietzsche is one of the first philosophers considered fundamental to the existentialist movement, though the movement did not exist until after his death, which is when his works became better known. While he was alive, however, Nietzsche was frequently associated with anarchist movements and proved influential for many anarchist thinkers, in spite of the fact that, in his writings, he seems to hold a negative view of anarchists. This was the result of a popular association during this period between his ideas and those of Max Stirner. (See: Relationship between Friedrich Nietzsche and Max Stirner.) As such, Nietzsche's Übermensch was representative of the freedom for people to define the nature of their own existence, as well as the desire for a new human who was to be neither master nor slave. Nietzsche's idealized individual invents his or her own values and creates the very terms under which they excel, taking no regard for God, the state, or the social behavior of 'herds'. It was these things that drew Nietzsche to anarchists and existentialists alike, showing the clear commonality between both.

Other forerunners

Some point to Mikhail Bakunin as possibly following a "philosophy of existence" against "the philosophy of essence" as advocated by Hegel, a figure whom many anarchists, in contrast to Marxists, have found authoritarian or even totalitarian. "Every individual," Bakunin writes, "inherits at birth, in different degrees, not ideas and innate sentiments, as the idealists claim, but only the capacity to feel, to will, to think, and to speak," a set of "rudimentary faculties without any content" which are filled through concrete experience. Foundational existentialist thinkers such as Søren Kierkegaard and Friedrich Nietzsche also voiced their opposition to Hegel for denying the role of the free individual, glorifying State and Church, and claiming "absolute knowledge" about human beings. While influenced by Hegel early in his life, Bakunin later was stridently opposed to Hegel around the time he became an anarchist, and would refuse to say he was ever influenced by him.

The transcendentalists, particularly Henry David Thoreau, were influential to anarchism and existentialism.

Early and middle 20th century

Kafka and Buber
In the first and middle decades of the 20th century, a number of philosophers and literary writers had explored existentialist themes. Before the Second World War, when existentialism was not yet in name, Franz Kafka and Martin Buber were among these thinkers who were also anarchists. Both are today sometimes seen as Jewish existentialists as well as Jewish anarchists.

It is agreed that Kafka's work cannot be reduced to either a philosophical or political theory, but this has not necessarily been an obstacle to making links from existentialism and anarchism to his principal writings. As far as politics, Kafka attended meetings of the Klub Mladých, a Czech anarchist, anti-militarist, and anti-clerical organization, and in one diary entry, Kafka referenced influential anarchist philosopher Peter Kropotkin: "Don't forget Kropotkin!"

In his works, Kafka famously wrote about surreal and alienated characters who struggle with hopelessness and absurdity, themes which were important to existentialism, yet simultaneously presented critiques of the authoritarian family (in The Metamorphosis) and bureaucracy (in such works as The Trial) as well, about which he had strong views as institutions. He spoke, for instance, of family life as a battleground: "I have always looked upon my parents as persecutors," he wrote in a letter, and that "All parents want to do is drag one down to them, back to the old days from which one longs to free oneself and escape." In this regard, he was speaking from experience, but he was also influenced by his friend Otto Gross, an Austrian anarchist and psychoanalyst. Otto Gross himself blended Nietzsche and Stirner with Sigmund Freud in developing his own libertarian form of psychology, feeling that they revealed the human potential frustrated by the authoritarian family: "Only now can we realize that the source of authority lies in the family, that the combination of sexuality and authority, shown in the family by the rights still assigned to the father, puts all individuality in fetters."

Agreeing with Gross and holding fundamental anarchist views, Kafka would also define capitalism as a bureaucracy, "a system of relations of dependence" where "everything is arranged hierarchically and everything is in chains", and that in the end "the chains of tortured humanity are made of the official papers of ministries". Martin Buber is best known for his philosophy of dialogue, a form of religious existentialism centered on the distinction between the I-Thou relationship and the I-It relationship. In his essay Ich und Du published in 1923, he writes how we cannot relate to other people through the "I" towards an "It", towards an object that is separate in itself. Instead, he believes human beings should find meaningfulness in human relationships, through "I" towards "Thou", towards people as ends-in-themselves which brings us ultimately towards God. This perspective could be seen as anarchist in that it implicitly critiques notions of "progress" fundamental to authoritarian ideologies which abstract from the personal here-and-now meeting of human beings. Later Martin Buber published a work, Paths in Utopia (1952), in which he explicitly detailed his anarchist views with his theory of the "dialogical community" founded upon interpersonal "dialogical relationships".

Post-war period

Following the Second World War, existentialism became a well-known and significant philosophical and cultural movement, and at this time undoubtedly influenced many anarchists. This was done mainly through the public prominence of two French writers, Jean-Paul Sartre and Albert Camus, who wrote best-selling novels, plays, and widely read journalism as well as theoretical texts.

An influential exponent of atheist existentialism, Sartre throughout his works stressed the expansion of individual freedom in a world without God or a fixed human nature. Just as anarchists have always stressed that deterministic blue-prints for ourselves or the future will never lead to freedom, Sartre believed human beings could choose for themselves their own freedom, a "being-for-itself" that is not enchained by the social, political, and economic roles imposed on them. This freedom may not always be completely joyous, as "man is condemned to be free" for Sartre. Anarchists argue likewise that an anarchist society would be desirable, but never inevitable and given to us, and thus we are left with what is the harder demand and responsibility for ourselves alone to create such a society.

It was for a brief period between 1939 and 1940 that Sartre was an anarcho-pacifist. Although best known for his Marxist politics and for aligning with the French Communist Party and the Maoists during 1968, Sartre said after the May rebellion, "If one rereads all my books, one will realize that I have not changed profoundly, and that I have always remained an anarchist." Towards the end of his life, Sartre explicitly embraced anarchism.

Although rejecting the term "existentialism", Camus was a friend of Sartre's, and has been considered part of the existentialist movement. As another exponent of atheist existentialism, he concerned his works with facing what he called the absurd, and how we should act to rebel against absurdity by living, by opening up the road to freedom without a transcendent reality. Camus would also be associated with the French anarchist movement. The anarchist André Prudhommeaux first introduced him at a meeting in 1948 of the Cercle des Étudiants Anarchistes (Anarchist Student Circle) as a sympathizer familiar with anarchist thought. He wrote for anarchist publications such as Le Libertaire, La révolution Proletarienne and Solidaridad Obrera (Worker Solidarity, the organ of the anarcho-syndicalist Confederación Nacional del Trabajo), and stood with the anarchists when they expressed support for the uprising of 1953 in East Germany. He also again allied with the anarchists in 1956, first in support of the workers' uprising in Poznań, Poland, and then later in the year with the Hungarian Revolution.

One of the most substantial expressions of both his existentialist and anarchist positions appears in his work The Rebel. For Camus, as for Nietzsche, rebellion should not delve into nihilism, and as for Stirner, should be distinct from revolution. It is not a lonely act, and does not destroy human solidarity but affirms the common nature of human beings. In the experience of the absurd, suffering is individual, but when it moves to rebellion, it is aware of being collective. The first step of the alienated individual, Camus argues, is to recognize that he or she shares such alienation with all human beings. Rebellion therefore takes the individual out of isolation: "I rebel, therefore we are." At the end of his book, Camus celebrates the anti-authoritarian spirit in history and comes out in favor of anarcho-syndicalism as the only alternative: "Trade-unionism, like the commune, is the negation, to the benefit of reality, of abstract and bureaucratic centralism."

Compared by critics to Kafka and Camus, Stig Dagerman was the main representative of a group of Swedish writers called "Fyrtiotalisterna" ("the writers of the 1940s") who channeled existentialist feelings of fear, alienation, and meaninglessness common in the wake of the horrors of World War II and the looming Cold War. He was also an active anarchist throughout his life, and joined the Syndicalist Youth Federation, the youth organization of a syndicalist union, in 1941. At nineteen, he became the editor of "Storm", the youth paper, and at age twenty-two, he was appointed the cultural editor of Arbetaren ("The Worker"), then a daily newspaper of the syndicalist movement. He called "Arbetaren" his "spiritual birthplace".

Influence of existentialism
Italian anarchist Pietro Ferrua became an admirer of Sartre during this period and considered existentialism the logical philosophy for anarchists and "had written some papers on that topic". Marie Louise Berneri wrote that "in France, Jean-Paul Sartre, André Breton, and Camus... have all fought the battle of the individual against the State".

In his essay Existentialism, Marxism, and Anarchism (1949), English anarchist Herbert Read acknowledges the link between anarchism and existentialism. Read takes an interest in the writings of Søren Kierkegaard, Martin Heidegger, and Jean-Paul Sartre, and juxtaposes existentialism with his own anarchism, considering both to be superior to Marxism. Read was one of the earliest writers outside of continental Europe to take notice of the movement, and was perhaps the closest England came to an existentialist theorist of the European tradition. He was also strongly influenced by Max Stirner, noting the closeness between Stirner's egoism and existentialism, and wrote an enthusiastic Preface to the 1953 English translation of Albert Camus's The Rebel.

Contemporary era
Although throughout the 1940s and 1950s existentialism was the dominant European intellectual movement, in the 1960s it was starting to lose its influence in the face of growing negative response. During the 1960s, there would be little or no existentialist movement to speak of, and what popularity it had would become far more overshadowed by structuralism, post-structuralism, and postmodernism, intellectual approaches which are today still widely used in academia. However, existentialism, particularly existential phenomenology, would still remain a significant influence on post-structuralism and postmodernism; one commentator has argued that post-structuralists might just as accurately be called "post-phenomenologists". Like existentialism, these approaches reject essentialist or reductionist notions, and are critical of dominant Western philosophy and culture, rejecting previous systems of knowledge based on the human knower. Since the 1980s, therefore, a growing number of anarchist philosophies, represented by the term "post-anarchism", have used post-structuralist and postmodernist approaches.

Saul Newman has utilized prominently Max Stirner and Friedrich Nietzsche along with such thinkers as Jacques Lacan in his post-anarchist works. Newman criticizes classical anarchists for assuming an objective human nature and a natural order, which existentialism also objects to. He argues that from this approach, humans progress and are well-off by nature, with only the Establishment as a limitation that forces behavior otherwise. For Newman, this is a Manichaean worldview, which depicts only the reversal of Thomas Hobbes' Leviathan, in which the "good" state is subjugated by the "evil" people. Lewis Call and Michel Onfray have also attempted to develop post-anarchist theory through the work of Friedrich Nietzsche.

In The Politics of Individualism (1993), anarcha-feminist L. Susan Brown explicitly argues for the continuing relevance of existentialism and its necessary complement to anarchism. She believes anarchism is a philosophy based on "existential individualism" that emphasizes the freedom of the individual, and defines "existential individualism" as the belief in freedom for freedom's sake, as opposed to "instrumental individualism", which more often exists in liberal works and is defined as freedom to satisfy individual interests without a meaningful belief in freedom. But she argues, like post-anarchists, that classical anarchist theory has asserted human beings as naturally cooperative, and that this fixed human nature presents many problems for anarchism as it contradicts its commitment to free will and the individual. For anarchism to be fundamentally individualist, she argues, it must look to existentialism for a more "fluid conceptualization of human nature". She looks to the works of Jean-Paul Sartre and Simone de Beauvoir in particular and sees them as being compatible with anarchism.

Brown argues that anarchism does not generally take into account feminist ideas of child-raising. For instance, the idea of raising children existentially free from their parents and educated non-hierarchically by a community, is not often considered by anarchists, and yet radical thinkers from the highly Nietzsche-influenced Otto Gross to existentialist psychiatrists such as R.D. Laing and post-structuralists Gilles Deleuze and Félix Guattari have argued forcefully that the nuclear family is one of the most oppressive, if not the most, institutions in Western society.

Contemporary anarchist Simon Critchley sees the existential phenomenologist Emmanuel Levinas's self-defined "an-archic" ethics, the infinite ethical demand that is beyond measure and "an-archic" in the sense of having no hierarchical principle or rule to structure it, as important for actual contemporary anarchist social practice. His book Infinitely Demanding: Ethics of Commitment, Politics of Resistance propounds a Levinasian conception of anarchism and an attempt to practice it. The contemporary French anarchist and self-described hedonist philosopher, Michel Onfray, published a book on Albert Camus called The Libertarian Order: The Philosophical Life of Albert Camus (2012).

See also

Autarchism
Egoist anarchism
Individualist anarchism
Nihilist movement

References

Bibliography

Further reading
 Moore, John. I Am Not a Man, I Am Dynamite!: Friedrich Nietzsche and the Anarchist Tradition (2005). Autonomedia.
 Marshall, Peter. "Existentialism". Demanding the Impossible: A History of Anarchism (2010). Oakland CA: PM Press.
 Onfray, Michel. L'ordre Libertaire: La vie philosophique de Albert Camus. Flammarion. 2012
 Levi, Mijal. Kafka and Anarchism (1972). Revisionist Press.
 Goodman, Paul. Kafka's Prayer (1947). New York: Vanguard Press.
 Buber, Martin. I And Thou (1971). Touchstone.
 Buber, Martin Paths in Utopia (1996). Syracuse University Press.
 Sartre at Seventy.
 Sartre By Himself.
 Camus, Albert. The Rebel (1956). New York: Vintage.
 Read, Herbert. Existentialism, Marxism, and Anarchism, Chains of Freedom (1949). London: Freedom Press.
 Newman, Saul. From Bakunin to Lacan: Anti-Authoritarianism and the Dislocation of Power (2001). Lanham MD: Lexington Books.
 Brown, L. Susan. The Politics of Individualism: Liberalism, Liberal Feminism and Anarchism (1993). Montreal: Black Rose Books.
 Critchley, Simon. Infinitely Demanding: Ethics of Commitment, Politics of Resistance (2007). New York: Verso.
 Remley, William L. Jean-Paul Sartre’s Anarchist Philosophy (2018) London: Bloomsbury

External links
 The Ego and Its Own HTML version
 Egzystencjalizm
Levinas and Anarchism. Articles and Research Tools by Mitchell Cowen Verter

Anarchist theory
Anarchist schools of thought
Anarchism
Post-left anarchism